Kroppenstedtia is a bacterial genus from the family of Thermoactinomycetaceae.

References

Further reading 
 
 

Bacillales
Bacteria genera